From 20 to 23 September 1993, during the Sukhumi massacre, separatists in Sukhumi, Abkhazia blocked Georgian troops' overland supply routes as part of the war in Abkhazia. In response, the Georgian government used Sukhumi Babushara Airport to ferry supplies to troops stationed in Sukhumi. Abkhaz forces attacked the airport in an attempt to further block the supply routes.

During the siege of the airport, five civilian airliners belonging to Transair Georgia and Orbi Georgian Airways were hit by missiles allegedly fired by separatists in Sukhumi. Over 150 people died in the attacks.

20 September 
Two Orbi Georgian Airways' Tupolev Tu-134As (registration 4L-65808 and 65809) were destroyed by Abkhaz small arms fire or missiles with no casualties.

21 September 
A Transair Тu-134А-3 (built in 1975 with registration 65893 and factory number 5340120) was flying to Sukhumi from Sochi International Airport. The crew consisted of captain Geras Georgievich Tabuev, first officer Otar Grigorievich Shengelia, and navigator Sergey Alexandrovich Shah, as well as two flight attendants; G. K. Kvaratskhelia and O. I. Morgunov. Тhe 22 passengers were mainly journalists. The missile had been fired from an Abkhaz boat commanded by Toriy Achba. The plane crashed into the Black Sea, killing all five crew members and 22 passengers. Other sources reported 28 people on board (six crew members and 22 passengers).

22 September 
An Orbi Georgian Airways Tu-154B aircraft (built in 1976 with registration 85163 and factory number 76А-163) flying from Tbilisi and carrying civilians and internal security forces was on approach to Sukhumi-Babusheri Airport when it was struck by surface-to-air missiles. The plane crash-landed on the airstrip; the ensuing fire killed 108 of the 132 passengers and crew, making the incident the deadliest aviation disaster to occur in Georgia. Georgian media claimed that the flight was carrying refugees, but there was no factual evidence to back up these claims.

Another Tu-154 was attacked later in the evening, but landed safely.

23 September 
Passengers were boarding a Transair Tu-134A (built in 1975 with registrations CCCP-65001 and factory number 42235) at Sukhumi when it was struck by rockets from an Abkhaz BM-21 Grad rocket launcher.  It caught fire and burned, leaving one crew member dead. The aircraft was due to operate a Sukhumi-Tbilisi service.

On the same day, an ORBI Tu-154 (registration 85359) was reportedly destroyed by mortar or artillery fire.

References

Airliner shootdown incidents
Abkhaz–Georgian conflict
War crimes
Aviation accidents and incidents in Georgia (country)
Aviation accidents and incidents in 1993
1993 in Georgia (country)
Accidents and incidents involving the Tupolev Tu-134
Accidents and incidents involving the Tupolev Tu-154
Transair Georgia accidents and incidents
1993 in Abkhazia
20th-century aircraft shootdown incidents
September 1993 events in Asia
1993 disasters in Georgia (country)